Events from the year 1796 in Sweden

Incumbents
 Monarch – Gustav IV Adolf

Events

 September - The King visits the Imperial court of Catherine the Great in Saint Petersburg in Russia to be engaged to Grand Duchess Alexandra Pavlovna of Russia. He discontinues the plans when told that she will not be required to convert to Lutheranism. 
16 October: The Church of Sweden Timrå Church is inaugurated.
 1 November - The King is declared of age and the guardian government of Duke Charles is dissolved.
 - Norrköping jungfrustift is dissolved.
 - Royal Swedish Academy of War Sciences

Births

 23 July – Franz Berwald, composer  (died 1868)
 3 September – Henriette Widerberg, opera primadonna  (died 1872)
 - Anna Elisabeth Hartwick, lace industrialist (died 1882)

Deaths

 17 March – Carl Fredrik Adelcrantz, architect and civil servant  (born 1716)
 12 November – Margareta Christina Giers, painter  (born 1731)

References

 
Years of the 18th century in Sweden
Sweden